Josef Svatopluk Machar (1864 – 1942) was a Czech poet and essayist. A leader of the realist movement in Czech poetry and a master of colloquial Czech, Machar was active in anti-Austrian political circles in Vienna. Many of his poems were satires of political and social conditions. In the poetic cycle The Conscience of the Ages (1901–1921), of which Golgotha was the initial volume, he contrasted antique with Christian civilization, favoring the former. His Magdalena (1893, translated into English by Leo Wiener, 1916), a satirical novel in verse, concerns the treatment of women. Both Machar's use of colloquial diction and his skepticism greatly influenced Czech literature and public opinion. He was the father of Sylva Macharová, one of the first Czech nurses and first head of the Czech School of Nursing.

He cooperated with T. G. Masaryk resistance organization Maffie from December 1914.

References

External links 

 Several works by Josef Svatopluk Machar on the website of the Municipal Library in Prague (in Czech)

1854 births
1942 deaths
Writers from Kolín
People from the Kingdom of Bohemia
Czech Realist Party politicians
Czechoslovak National Democracy politicians
Members of the Revolutionary National Assembly of Czechoslovakia
Czech poets
Czech male poets